KWKR (99.9 FM) is a mainstream rock formatted broadcast radio station licensed to Leoti, Kansas, serving the Garden City market though its signal aligns more to West-Central Kansas. KWKR is owned by Mark Yearout, through licensee Southwind Broadcasting, LLC.

On November 27, 2019, KWKR changed its format from sports to mainstream rock, branded as "The Rock 99.9".

Previous logo

References

External links
The Rock Online

1983 establishments in Kansas
Radio stations established in 1983
WKR